This is a list of oldest Major League Baseball players. Major League Baseball (MLB) is a professional baseball organization in North America. The oldest person ever to play MLB was Satchel Paige, who, at the age of 59, made one token major league appearance twelve years after his Major League career had ended. The oldest player to appear regularly was Jack Quinn, who ended his last season at age 50, having made 14 appearances as a relief pitcher in that final season. The oldest active player is Pittsburgh Pirates pitcher Rich Hill, who is currently  years old.

Key

Oldest players

All-time

Note: Paige, O'Leary, O'Rourke, Jennings, Street, McGuire and Evers each made one token major league appearance years (or even decades) after their careers had otherwise ended.  The careers of Altrock, Miñoso, Austin, and Latham had also effectively ended many years before their final major league appearances, though each were brought back for token appearances several times (spanning several seasons) before their final game.  Julio Franco is the oldest position player to appear regularly.

Active

Last ten seasons

See also

List of oldest professional athletes by sport
List of oldest and youngest National Basketball Association players
List of oldest National Hockey League players

Notes

References

External links
 Article including sidebar on oldest players
 Oldest player by year
 ESPN column

Lists of Major League Baseball players
Major League Baseball Players, List of Oldest